The Sander illusion or Sander's parallelogram is an optical illusion described by the German psychologist Friedrich Sander (1889–1971) in 1926. However, it had been published earlier by Matthew Luckiesh in his 1922 book Visual Illusions: Their Causes, Characteristics, and Applications.

The diagonal line bisecting the larger, left-hand parallelogram appears to be considerably longer than the diagonal line bisecting the smaller, right-hand parallelogram, but is the same length.

One possible reason for this illusion is that the diagonal lines around the blue lines give a perception of depth, and when the blue lines are included in that depth, they are perceived as different lengths.

References

Optical illusions